Apamea submarginata is a moth of the family Noctuidae.

Apamea (moth)
Moths described in 1900
Taxa named by John Henry Leech